In investment, an annuity is a series of payments made at equal intervals. Examples of annuities are regular deposits to a savings account, monthly home mortgage payments, monthly insurance payments and pension payments. Annuities can be classified by the frequency of payment dates. The payments (deposits) may be made weekly, monthly, quarterly, yearly, or at any other regular interval of time. Annuities may be calculated by mathematical functions known as "annuity functions".

An annuity which provides for payments for the remainder of a person's lifetime is a life annuity.

Types 
Annuities may be classified in several ways.

Timing of payments 
Payments of an annuity-immediate are made at the end of payment periods, so that interest accrues between the issue of the annuity and the first payment. Payments of an annuity-due are made at the beginning of payment periods, so a payment is made immediately on issueter.

Contingency of payments 
Annuities that provide payments that will be paid over a period known in advance are annuities certain or guaranteed annuities. Annuities paid only under certain circumstances are contingent annuities. A common example is a life annuity, which is paid over the remaining lifetime of the annuitant. Certain and life annuities are guaranteed to be paid for a number of years and then become contingent on the annuitant being alive.

Variability of payments 
Fixed annuities – These are annuities with fixed payments. If provided by an insurance company, the company guarantees a fixed return on the initial investment.  Fixed annuities are not regulated by the Securities and Exchange Commission.
Variable annuities – Registered products that are regulated by the SEC in the United States of America. They allow direct investment into various funds that are specially created for Variable annuities.  Typically, the insurance company guarantees a certain death benefit or lifetime withdrawal benefits.
Equity-indexed annuities – Annuities with payments linked to an index.  Typically, the minimum payment will be 0% and the maximum will be predetermined.  The performance of an index determines whether the minimum, the maximum or something in between is credited to the customer.

Deferral of payments 
An annuity that begins payments only after a period is a deferred annuity (usually after retirement). An annuity that begins payments as soon as the customer has paid, without a deferral period is an immediate annuity.

Valuation
Valuation of an annuity entails calculation of the present value of the future annuity payments. The valuation of an annuity entails concepts such as time value of money, interest rate, and future value.

Annuity-certain 
If the number of payments is known in advance, the annuity is an annuity certain or guaranteed annuity. Valuation of annuities certain may be calculated using formulas depending on the timing of payments.

Annuity-immediate
If the payments are made at the end of the time periods, so that interest is accumulated before the payment, the annuity is called an annuity-immediate, or ordinary annuity. Mortgage payments are annuity-immediate, interest is earned before being paid.
What is Annuity Due?
Annuity due refers to a series of equal payments made at the same interval at the beginning of each period. Periods can be monthly, quarterly, semi-annually, annually, or any other defined period. Examples of annuity due payments include rentals, leases, and insurance payments, which are made to cover services provided in the period following the payment.

The present value of an annuity is the value of a stream of payments, discounted by the interest rate to account for the fact that payments are being made at various moments in the future. The present value is given in actuarial notation by:

Present value is linear in the amount of payments, therefore the present value for payments, or rent  is:

In practice, often loans are stated per annum while interest is compounded and payments are made monthly.

The future value of an annuity is the accumulated amount, including payments and interest, of a stream of payments made to an interest-bearing account. For an annuity-immediate, it is the value immediately after the n-th payment. The future value is given by:

Future value is linear in the amount of payments, therefore the future value for payments, or rent  is:

Example: The present value of a 5-year annuity with a nominal annual interest rate of 12% and monthly payments of $100 is:

The rent is understood as either the amount paid at the end of each period in return for an amount PV borrowed at time zero, the principal of the loan, or the amount paid out by an interest-bearing account at the end of each period when the amount PV is invested at time zero, and the account becomes zero with the n-th withdrawal.

Future and present values are related since:

and

Proof of annuity-immediate formula 
To calculate present value, the k-th payment must be discounted to the present by dividing by the interest, compounded by k terms. Hence the contribution of the k-th payment R would be . Just considering R to be 1, then:

which gives us the result as required.

Similarly, we can prove the formula for the future value. The payment made at the end of the last year would accumulate no interest and the payment made at the end of the first year would accumulate interest for a total of (n − 1) years. Therefore,

Annuity-due

An annuity-due is an annuity whose payments are made at the beginning of each period. Deposits in savings, rent or lease payments, and insurance premiums are examples of annuities due.

Each annuity payment is allowed to compound for one extra period. Thus, the present and future values of an annuity-due can be calculated.

The future and present values for annuities due are related since:

Example: The final value of a 7-year annuity-due with a nominal annual interest rate of 9% and monthly payments of $100 can be calculated by:

 

In Excel, the PV and FV functions take on optional fifth argument which selects from annuity-immediate or annuity-due.

An annuity-due with n payments is the sum of one annuity payment now and an ordinary annuity with one payment less, and also equal, with a time shift, to an ordinary annuity. Thus we have:

. The value at the time of the first of n payments of 1.
. The value one period after the time of the last of n payments of 1.

Perpetuity

A perpetuity is an annuity for which the payments continue forever. Observe that

Therefore a perpetuity has a finite present value when there is a non-zero discount rate. The formulae for a perpetuity are

Life annuities 
Valuation of life annuities may be performed by calculating the actuarial present value of the future life contingent payments. Life tables are used to calculate the probability that the annuitant lives to each future payment period. Valuation of life annuities also depends on the timing of payments just as with annuities certain, however life annuities may not be calculated with similar formulas because actuarial present value accounts for the probability of death at each age.

Amortization calculations

If an annuity is for repaying a debt P with interest, the amount owed after n payments is

Because the scheme is equivalent with borrowing the amount  to create a perpetuity with coupon , and putting  of that borrowed amount in the bank to grow with interest .

Also, this can be thought of as the present value of the remaining payments

See also fixed rate mortgage.

Example calculations

Formula for finding the periodic payment R, given A:
 

Examples:
 Find the periodic payment of an annuity due of $70,000, payable annually for 3 years at 15% compounded annually.
 R  = 70,000/(1+〖(1-(1+((.15)/1) )〗^(-(3-1))/((.15)/1))
 R = 70,000/2.625708885
 R = $26659.46724

Find PVOA factor as.
1) find r as, (1 ÷ 1.15)= 0.8695652174
2) find r × (rn − 1) ÷ (r − 1)
08695652174 × (−0.3424837676)÷ (−1304347826) = 2.2832251175
70000÷ 2.2832251175= $30658.3873 is the correct value

 Find the periodic payment of an annuity due of $250,700, payable quarterly for 8 years at 5% compounded quarterly.
 R= 250,700/(1+〖(1-(1+((.05)/4) )〗^(-(32-1))/((.05)/4))
 R = 250,700/26.5692901
 R = $9,435.71

Finding the Periodic Payment(R), Given S:

R = S\,/((〖((1+(j/m) )〗^(n+1)-1)/(j/m)-1)

Examples:
 Find the periodic payment of an accumulated value of $55,000, payable monthly for 3 years at 15% compounded monthly.
 R=55,000/((〖((1+((.15)/12) )〗^(36+1)-1)/((.15)/12)-1)
 R = 55,000/45.67944932
 R = $1,204.04
 Find the periodic payment of an accumulated value of $1,600,000, payable annually for 3 years at 9% compounded annually.
 R=1,600,000/((〖((1+((.09)/1) )〗^(3+1)-1)/((.09)/1)-1)
 R = 1,600,000/3.573129
 R = $447,786.80

Legal regimes
 Annuities under American law
 Annuities under European law
 Annuities under Swiss law

See also
Amortization calculator
Fixed rate mortgage
Life annuity
Perpetuity
Time value of money

References

 
 

Finance theories